George Alexander Dewar (25 March 1868 – 2 August 1953) was an Australian politician.

He was born in Ballarat to waiter Donald Dewar and Sarah Dallas. He was educated in Melbourne and became a rural worker, before mining at Chiltern. His union involvement saw him move away to become a firewood cutter, and around 1903 he settled at Mudgee. He later became a brewer, and in 1921 was appointed to the New South Wales Legislative Council as a Labor member. He served until the reconstitution of the Council in 1934, and later retired to Mount Isa. He died in Sydney in August 1953.

References

1868 births
1953 deaths
Australian Labor Party members of the Parliament of New South Wales
Members of the New South Wales Legislative Council